McClymonds High School is a public high school in the West Oakland neighborhood of Oakland, California, United States.

In addition to being the third oldest high school in Oakland, it is the only comprehensive high school in West Oakland, operated by the Oakland Unified School District.

History

Early history (1915-2005)
In January 1915, McClymonds High School started in a small building formerly occupied by Oakland Technical High School. Originally, 60 students were enrolled in the school, which at that time was called Vocational High School. It was the first public school in California to offer summer school.

The school was named after J.W. McClymonds, who at one time was the superintendent of the Oakland Unified School District. Ida Louise Jackson, the first black teacher in the Oakland district, taught at McClymonds before her retirement in 1953.

In 1927, with $325,000 spent on additional classrooms, the school became more of a regular school than a summer school. In 1933, the legislative act was passed, regulating school building construction. This required that schools have steel and structural support on the inside. The building did not meet these requirements.

The school decided to move to 14th and Myrtle Street in the same building with Lowell Junior High School. McClymonds High thereby became a four year high school. The name changed from J.W. McClymonds to Lowell McClymonds, then to McClymonds Lowell High School. Finally, in September 1938, the official name of the school became McClymonds, and it was moved to 26th and Myrtle.

McClymonds Educational Complex (2005-2010)

In 2005, McClymonds was split into three smaller schools: BEST, EXCEL, and Kizmet Academy, collectively known as McClymonds Educational Complex.

"Mack Is Back!" (2010-present)
In 2010, McClymonds Educational Complex returned to being McClymonds High School.  The school's 2010-11 theme was "Mack is Back!"

On September 24, 2010, the school opened a new, state-of-the-art football field, William Belford Stadium, named in honor of the late William "Bill" Belford (often called the "godfather" of McClymonds sports).

Notable events and mentions in the media
Malcolm X gave a speech at McClymonds at a function sponsored by the Afro-American Association. A young Muhammad Ali also spoke at the function. The Black Panthers co-founder Huey P. Newton was in attendance. The Afro-American Association also held a demonstration at the school in 1963 about the importance of staying in school and studying.

Currently, many students are working in conjunction with students from nearby UC Berkeley to revitalize a dilapidated drug-ridden park into a history learning park and expand it into the school's campus.

McClymonds was featured in the book Black in School: Afrocentric Reform, Urban Youth & the Promise of Hip-Hop Culture, by Shawn Ginwright.

Academics
McClymonds's average SAT score for 2013 was 1155 out of 2400. The nation's average SAT score for the year was 1497.

In 2007, McClymonds had over 100 graduates.

In 2008, McClymonds had the highest CAHSEE test scores in the Oakland Unified School District.

McClymonds High School's graduation rate is over 80%, surpassing the District's graduation rate, which is around 74%.

There are two career pathways at McClymonds: Engineering and Entrepreneurship.  Students choose their pathway toward the end of their freshman year, after being exposed to various pathway and career exploration activities.  Entrepreneurship students have the opportunity to gain a Certificate of Entrepreneurship from Merritt College through their dual enrollment partnership and 5-course sequence.

Sports
The McClymonds varsity football team which was led by captain and starter on both sides of the ball Dwayne Washington won the Division 5A state championship in January 2017. The Warriors defeated the La Jolla Country Day HS with a score or 20-17. The following year, McClymonds won a second consecutive state championship, defeating the Golden West High School Trailblazers in the California Division 5AA Football Championship 42-12. In 2019

The McClymonds varsity basketball team won a state Tournament of Champions held in 1978 at the Oracle Arena.

McClymonds offers a variety of sports, including football, baseball, basketball, cross-country, track, tennis, and volleyball.

On May 16, 2006, the Oakland City Council adopted a resolution, sponsored by Council Member Nancy J. Nadel (District 3), congratulating the McClymonds Football Team For Excellence in Athletics and Academics, recognizing that McClymonds High School had ranked #1 in the East Bay and Northern California as the high school with the most football players (9) attending Division I universities, under the direction of head football coach Alonzo Carter.  McClymonds was the only high school in the nation that year with three Top 100 prospects, and, with only 600-650 students, ranked #1 in Northern California for Division I Signees, and ranked #2 in the State, behind Long Beach Poly, which had 5,000 students.

On March 15, 2008, McClymonds achieved its first ever Division I state championship basketball win over Dominguez High School of Compton, California, 73-54, at the Arco Arena, as the culmination of their undefeated streak of 32 wins and no losses.

Chappell Hayes Health Center
McClymonds' health center, founded by Children's Hospital doctor and UC Berkeley alumna Barbara Staggers, and named after activist Chappell Hayes, was opened in 2005.  In creating the Health Center, Dr. Staggers partnered with Lisa Hardy, MD., Division Chief of Psychiatry at Children's, to ensure that mental health services would also be available to the school community.  It serves McClymonds' students and alumni, and members of the West Oakland community.

Groundwater contamination
In February 2020, a report stated that groundwater beneath the tennis courts was contaminated with a cancer-causing chemical. However, the California Department of Toxic Substances concluded upon a thorough investigation that toxic substances "were not found in inside or outside air or in drinking/pool water. Because TCE and PCE are not present in inside or outside air at McClymonds High School, and because students and staff are not in contact with soil vapor or groundwater, DTSC concludes that students and staff are not at risk.”. The Site Investigation Report has been shared with the District and the community, and it has been deemed safe for individuals to return to campus as of June 2020.

Notable alumni

 Vince Albritton, former NFL safety
 Odis Allison, NBA player 
 Antonio Davis, NBA player
 Ron Dellums, former U.S. Congressman and mayor of Oakland
 Joe Ellis, NBA player
 Curt Flood, MLB player in St. Louis Cardinals Hall of Fame (Flood v. Kuhn)
 MC Hammer, Grammy-winning rapper
Richard "Dimples" Fields (1941-2000) American R&B and soul singer
 John Handy, alto saxophonist, composer, arranger and world musician
 Kirk Morrison, former NFL linebacker
 Wendell Hayes, former NFL running back
 Jim Hines, Olympic gold medalist, 100 meters dash world record holder, first man to break 10 second barrier
 Leondaus "Lee" Lacy, MLB player, two-time World Series Champion
 Ernie Lombardi, Hall of Fame catcher for the Cincinnati Reds
 Dante Marsh, CFL cornerback for BC Lions
 Demetrius "Hook" Mitchell, one of the greatest street basketball players
 Marty Paich, jazz musician
 Marcus Peters, NFL player for the Baltimore Ravens
 Nicholas Petris, California state senator
 Vada Pinson, MLB player in Cincinnati Reds Hall of Fame
 Aaron Pointer, MLB player and NFL referee
 Billy Raimondi, baseball player
 Curt Roberts, first African American fielded by Pittsburgh Pirates
 Frank Robinson, MLB player and manager, Hall of Fame; only MLB player to win Most Valuable Player Award in both leagues
 Bill Russell, NBA Hall of Famer, 11-time NBA Champion (most championships by a player in NBA history)
 Roy Shivers, former NFL running back
 Ruth Pointer, original member of The Pointer Sisters
 Paul Silas, NBA player and coach, member of College Basketball Hall of Fame
 Brandon Smith, CFL player for Calgary Stampeders
 Willie Tasby, MLB player
 Nate Williams, NBA player
 Michael White, jazz violinist 
 Lionel Wilson, former mayor of Oakland, first African-American mayor of Oakland
 Yahya Abdul-Mateen II, actor and architect
LeRonne Armstrong, Chief, Oakland Police Department

See also
List of Oakland, California high schools

References

External links
Y.E.L.L. - giving McClymonds a new future
Article referencing sports
History
More history
Website of SFF, an organization giving grant money to McClymonds

Educational institutions established in 1915
High schools in Oakland, California
Public high schools in California
1915 establishments in California
Oakland Unified School District